Tero Katajisto (born 12 September 1971) is a Finnish wrestler. He competed in the men's Greco-Roman 54 kg at the 2000 Summer Olympics.

References

External links
 

1971 births
Living people
Finnish male sport wrestlers
Olympic wrestlers of Finland
Wrestlers at the 2000 Summer Olympics
People from Kurikka
Sportspeople from South Ostrobothnia